Pa'ar Cave is a karstic sinkhole in the Upper Galilee, Israel.

History
The cave is located between the Adir peak (part of the Meron range), and kibbutz Sasa. The sinkhole channels the water flowing from the Pa'ar stream to groundwater level.

The cave is part of a 14-dunam nature reserve, declared in 1967, that bears its name. The reserve is home to Palestine Oak (Quercus calliprinos) and Quercus infectoria oak trees, Hawthorn trees (Crataegus azarolus aronia), Dog Rose (Rosa canina) bushes, and Sternbergia bulb flowers.

See also
List of caves in Israel
Geology of Israel

References

External links
 
 Photos from the Reserve

Caves of Israel
Nature reserves in Israel
Limestone caves